Simeon ben Gamliel (I) ( or רשב"ג הראשון; c. 10 BCE – 70 CE) was a Tanna sage and leader of the Jewish people. He served as nasi of the Great Sanhedrin at Jerusalem during the outbreak of the First Jewish–Roman War, succeeding his father in the same office after his father's death in 52 CE and just before the destruction of the Second Temple.

The great-grandson of Hillel the Elder, he was considered to be a direct descendant of King David. He was a contemporary of the high priests Ḥanan ben Ḥanan and Yehoshua ben Gamla.

He is one of the Ten Martyrs mentioned in Jewish liturgy. According to the Iggeret of Rabbi Sherira Gaon  he was beheaded, along with Rabbi Ishmael ben Elisha the High Priest, prior to the Temple's destruction, although the historian Josephus Flavius mentions only the execution of Ishmael in Cyrene during the First Jewish–Roman War (ca. 66-68 CE). The account is mentioned in both Tractate Semachot ch 8, and in Avot de-Rabbi Nathan (38:3), where he is given the title of nasi, along with the dignitary title of "Rabban" ("our Master"). No contemporary Greek or Roman historian has left an account of his beheading by the Romans at Cyrene, but Josephus may have alluded to the cause by writing in his Vita that Simeon, during the outbreak of the First Jewish Revolt, gave his verbal support to the warring faction in Galilee under John of Gischala. Before his death, he and his fellow jurists opposed the appointment of Josephus as military governor of the Galilee and sought to remove him from that post, but to no avail. 

His tomb is traditionally located in Kafr Kanna, in the lower Galilee of northern Israel.

Quotes
 All my life have I been reared among the Sages, but I have found nothing better for the body than silence; 'Tis not the conveyance of teachings which is the principal [aim], but rather the discharge of one's duty (i.e. action). Whosoever is verbose brings on sin.
 By three things is the world sustained: by judgment, by truth, and by peace.

References

1st-century BCE Jews
1st-century rabbis
10s BC births
70 deaths
Jewish martyrs
Mishnah rabbis
People executed by the Roman Empire
People of the First Jewish–Roman War
Pirkei Avot rabbis
Sanhedrin